The Chagrin Falls waterfalls are waterfalls spouting off of the Chagrin River in the center of the village of Chagrin Falls, Ohio. At the waterfall base, a viewing area is available. The falls were one of the largest industrial centers in the 1800s and are responsible for the growth of the village around them.

History 
The Chagrin Falls originally got their name from a French trader named François Seguin, who traded with Native Americans in the early 1700s. The river later adopted the name "Chagrin". At one point the Chagrin Falls was the industrial center of Northeast Ohio and powered 9 different mills at their peak.  The first settlers arrived in 1833 and they had previously been from New England.  With the profits they made from their mill work on the falls, they began to build their homes around the river and created the now current day Chagrin Falls village.

Geography 
The Chagrin river flows through the center of Chagrin Falls Village. The falls have a drop of 20 feet and a crest line of 60 feet. The water at the bottom of the falls ranges from 2–15 feet.

Wildlife 
The waterfalls and their surrounding areas provide habitats for multiple types of Northeastern Ohio's native animals.  Some of these animals include salamanders, squirrels, groundhogs, coyote, and other small animals. There is also a large fish population due to the location of the river.  Some of the species include western blacknose dace, creek chub, bluegill sunfish, largemouth bass, and yellow bullhead.

Notable Events

Blossom Time Festival 
On Memorial Day weekend every year, the town holds a Blossom time festival.  The festival features live music, carnival rides, games and a race.

New Years Eve 
Residents gather in the park to watch a giant popcorn ball drop at midnight.  The popcorn ball is provided by the local Popcorn Shop.

References 

Bodies of water of Cuyahoga County, Ohio